Meixian Airport  is an airport serving the city of Meizhou in Guangdong province, China. It also called Meizhou Meixian Changgangji International Airport and commenced operations on 1 September 1987.

Airlines and destinations

Passenger

Ground transportation
Meixian Airport is served by the city bus network through routes 3 and 11 (both routes towards downtown Meizhou).

See also
List of airports in China

References

Airports in Guangdong
Meizhou